El Encuentro is a live album by Argentine bandoneon player and composer Dino Saluzzi with cellist Anja Lechner and The Metropole Orchestra recorded in 2009 and released on the ECM label.

Reception
The Allmusic review by Thom Jurek awarded the album 4 stars stating "El Encuentro ("The Meeting") is a series of musical short stories that ultimately become an entire narrative".  
The All About Jazz review by John Kelman stated "El Encuentro, Saluzzi's first live recording, expands on its antecedents both in scope and palette". The JazzTimes review by Mike Joyce stated "Those who enjoy Saluzzi’s collaborations with his brother, tenor saxophonist Felix Saluzzi, and cellist Anja Lechner won’t be disappointed by their soulful and lyrical contributions, or the skill with which they develop independent voices that color and sustain the composer’s signature narrative threads".

Track listing
All compositions by Dino Saluzzi
 "Vals de los Días" - 15:29 
 "Plegaria Andina" - 17:14 
 "El Encuentro" - 21:44 
 "Miserere" - 14:30

Personnel
Dino Saluzzi — bandoneón
Anja Lechner — cello (tracks 1-3)
Felix ´Cuchara´ Saluzzi — tenor saxophone (track 2)
Metropole Orchestra — conducted by Jules Buckley

References

ECM Records albums
Dino Saluzzi albums
2003 albums
Albums produced by Manfred Eicher